Troy: Music from the Motion Picture is 2004 soundtrack album from the epic adventure war film. Composed by James Horner, it was released on May 11, 2004 via Reprise Records.

Background
Composer Gabriel Yared originally worked on the score for Troy for over a year, having been hired by the director, Wolfgang Petersen.

Yared wrote and recorded his score and Tanja Carovska provided vocals on various portions of the music, as she later would on composer James Horner's version of the soundtrack. However, after a screening of the film with an early incomplete version of the score, the reactions at test screenings were against it and in less than a day Yared was off the project without being given a chance to fix or change his music, while Warner Bros was already looking for a replacement. According to Yared, his score was removed due to a complaint by the screening audience that the score was too "old-fashioned".

The replacement score was written by composer James Horner in about four weeks. He used Carovska's vocals again and also included traditional Eastern Mediterranean music and brass instruments. Drums are conspicuous in the most dramatic scenes: most notably, in the duel between Achilles and Hector. Horner also collaborated with American singer/songwriter Josh Groban and lyricist Cynthia Weil to write an original song for the film's end credits. The product of this collaboration, "Remember Me" was performed by Groban with additional vocals by Tanja Tzarovska. The song is available on the film's original soundtrack. There is a slight difference between the version of the song available on CD soundtrack and the one playing in the end credits.

Track listing

Reception
The music critic Alex Ross claims that large portions of the score were essentially plagiarized from works by Shostakovich and Prokofiev; one instance cited by Ross, fanfares from the 'Sanctus' of Benjamin Britten's War Requiem, has been explicitly recognised by another critic as an "exact copy" by Horner.

Release
Around the time of the film's release in theaters, Gabriel Yared briefly made portions of his rejected score available on his personal website, which was later removed at the request of Warner Brothers. Bootleg versions exist on the Internet. Yared's score has since gained much attention from the fans of film music. Several petitions were made requesting the release of Yared's score either on a limited edition CD or as a bonus feature or secondary audio track on the film's DVD. Those requests however, have been denied by Warner Bros.

References

2004 soundtrack albums
Reprise Records soundtracks
Drama film soundtracks